"It's Midnight" is a 1974 song recorded by Elvis Presley. It was written by Jerry Chesnut and Billy Edd Wheeler.

Recording 
Elvis Presley recorded it during his December 10–16, 1973, recording sessions at Stax Records in Memphis. The session produced three more charting songs: "Promised Land", "If You Talk in Your Sleep" and "Help Me".

Release history 
The song was first released in October 1974 as a B-side to a cover of Chuck Berry's "Promised Land". (While the Goldmine Standard Catalog of American Records indicates "Promised Land" as the A-side, different pressings have "It's Midnight" as the A-side and "Promised Land" as a B-side and vice versa.)

Reception 
"Promised Land" rose to number 14 on the Billboard Hot 100, while the two sides together (as "It's Midnight / Promised Land") and "It's Midnight" on its own charted on the Hot Country Singles chart. "It's Midnight" peaked on it at number 9 in January 1975.

Critical reception 
Billboard in its review of the album Promised Land (in the January 18, 1975 issue) picked "It's Midnight" as one of the best cuts on the album.

Charts 

 * as "It's Midnight / Promised Land"
 ** as "It's Midnight"

References 

1974 songs
1974 singles
Elvis Presley songs
RCA Records singles
Songs written by Jerry Chesnut
Country ballads
Songs written by Billy Edd Wheeler
1970s ballads